Live and Unplugged is the debut live album and second acoustic release by American rock band Sleeping with Sirens. It was released on April 8, 2016 worldwide by Epitaph. The lead single, a different version of "Gold", a track from the band's previous album, Madness (2015), was released on February 12, 2016.

Background and recording 
The band's fourth studio album, Madness, was followed with a world tour with Pierce the Veil. After which, the band embarked on an acoustic tour, named We Like It Quiet (a reference to the song "We Like It Loud" from the group's previous album) with a sound similar to the band's first acoustic endeavour, If You Were a Movie, This Would Be Your Soundtrack. However, the two releases differed in that Live and Unplugged made use of more than just acoustic guitars, and has more of an alternative rock sound than the soft rock of the former.

The lead single was released via Twitter and gave fans a taste of how the album would sound. In an interview with Kerrang!, Kellin Quinn announced that it would be different due to the fact that the group's 'live dynamic is very different (in a good way) compared to [the band's] studio sound'.

Release and reception 
The album was met with critical acclaim. Hit the Floor gave it an almost perfect 9/10 rating, stating 'Sleeping With Sirens did a phenomenal job at keeping their tracks fun and fresh in their acoustic, unplugged state'.

It charted at number four on the UK Rock Charts.

Track listing

Charts

References 

2016 live albums
Epitaph Records live albums
Sleeping with Sirens albums